The 1943 U.S. National Championships (now known as the US Open) was a tennis tournament that took place on the outdoor grass courts at the West Side Tennis Club, Forest Hills in New York City, United States. The tournament ran from 1 September until 6 September. It was the 63rd staging of the U.S. National Championships and due to World War II it was the only Grand Slam tennis event of the year.

Finals

Men's singles

  Joseph R. Hunt defeated  Jack Kramer  6–3, 6–8, 10–8, 6–0

Women's singles

 Pauline Betz defeated  Louise Brough  6–3, 5–7, 6–3

Men's doubles
 Jack Kramer /  Frank Parker defeated  Bill Talbert /  David Freeman 6–2, 6–4, 6–4

Women's doubles
 Louise Brough /  Margaret Osborne defeated  Pauline Betz /  Doris Hart 6–4, 6–3

Mixed doubles
 Margaret Osborne /   Bill Talbert defeated  Pauline Betz /  Pancho Segura 10–8, 6–4

References

External links
Official US Open website

 
U.S. National Championships
U.S. National Championships (tennis) by year
U.S. National Championships
U.S. National Championships
U.S. National Championships